Polypeptide N-acetylgalactosaminyltransferase 11 is an enzyme that in humans is encoded by the GALNT11 gene.

The GALNT11 gene contains 10 exons. An important paralog of this gene is GALNTL5.

References

Further reading